The Annals of Pharmacotherapy is a monthly peer-reviewed medical journal covering all aspects of pharmacotherapy. It was established in 1967 as Drug Intelligence. The name changed a few times during its history, to Drug Intelligence & Clinical Pharmacy in 1969, and DICP: The Annals of Pharmacotherapy in 1989, before obtaining its current name in 1992.
According to the Journal Citation Reports, the journal has a 2020 impact factor of 3.154.

References

External links 

Pharmacotherapy journals
Monthly journals
English-language journals
Publications established in 1967
SAGE Publishing academic journals